Theodore Sadowski (April 1, 1936 – July 18, 1993) was an American professional baseball player and a middle-relief pitcher in the Major Leagues for the Washington Senators / Minnesota Twins (1960–62). He was the brother of  Bob Sadowski and Ed Sadowski, and uncle of Jim Sadowski.

Coming from a Pittsburgh baseball family, Sadowski himself had a 12-year pro career. He broke into the big leagues with the 1960 Senators, who the following season became the Minnesota Twins. In his three-season MLB career, he posted a 2–3 record with a 5.76 ERA and one save in 43 games and 84 innings pitched.

Sadowski died of cancer in Shaler Township, Pennsylvania, at age 57.

External links

Baseball Library

1936 births
1993 deaths
Albany Senators players
American people of Polish descent
Atlanta Crackers players
Baseball players from Pittsburgh
Burials at Allegheny Cemetery
Charleston Senators players
Charlotte Hornets (baseball) players
Dallas Rangers players
Deaths from cancer in Pennsylvania
Erie Sailors players
Fox Cities Foxes players
Kinston Eagles players
Major League Baseball pitchers
Minnesota Twins players
Minnesota Twins scouts
Syracuse Chiefs players
Tacoma Giants players
Vancouver Mounties players
Washington Senators (1901–1960) players
Wilson Tobs players